Flamini or variations may refer to:

People
 Flaminia gens, an ancient Roman family
 Gaius Flaminius (3rd century BC), politician and consul of the Roman Republic
 Anthony Flamini (born 1978), American comic book writer
 Mathieu Flamini (born 1984), French football player
 Manila Flamini (born 1987), Italian artistic swimmer
 Maurizio Flammini (born 29 November 1949) is an Italian former racing driver & World Superbike Championship creator

Other uses
 18099 Flamini, a minor planet
 Circus Flaminius, area of land in Rome outfitted with a small racetrack in 221 BC
 Lancia Flaminia (1957–1970), an Italian luxury car
 MSC Flaminia, a German container ship
 Porta Flaminia, an earlier name of the Porta del Popolo gate in Rome
 Ptyongnathosia flaminia, a species of moth of the family Tortricidae
 Via Flaminia, an ancient Roman road